Sir John McClelland (1805–1883) was a British medical doctor with interests in geology and biology, who worked for the East India Company.

In 1835 he was sent on a mission (Tea Committee) to identify if tea could be grown in north-eastern India along with Nathaniel Wallich and William Griffith. This mission ran into troubles with the members of the group.

McClelland was appointed 1836 as the secretary of the "Coal Committee", the forerunner of the Geological Survey of India (GSI), formed to explore possibilities to exploit Indian coal. He was the first to propose hiring professional geologists for the task. He was also involved in surveys of forests and his reports led to the establishment of the Forest Department in India.

He also served as an interim superintendent of the Calcutta Botanical Garden from 1846 to 1847 and was editor of the Calcutta Journal of Natural History from 1841–1847.

Legacy
McClelland is commemorated in the name of the mountain bulbul, Ixos mcclellandii.

A species of venomous snake, Sinomicrurus macclellandi, is also named in his honor.

Work
In his work as an ichthyologist he described many species and several genera of fish, among them Schistura.

See also
:Category:Taxa named by John McClelland (doctor)

Writings
McClelland J (1839). "Indian Cyprinidae". Asiatic Researches 19: 217–471.

References

Further reading
Desmond, Ray (1994). The European Discovery of the Indian Flora. Oxford University Press.

External links

Darwin correspondence

1800 births
1883 deaths
British businesspeople
19th-century British medical doctors
British geologists
British ornithologists
Indian ornithologists
19th-century British businesspeople